Martin Barba (born August 22, 1966) is an American former professional tennis player.

A native of California, Barba moved to Florida to live with his brother after their mother died in the late 1970s. He trained at Holiday Park in Fort Lauderdale, which was made famous for producing Chris Evert. Attending Lander College on a full scholarship, he earned NAIA All-American honors in 1985 and turned professional in 1988. He had an upset win over 16th-seed Jimmy Brown in the first round of the 1989 U.S. Pro Tennis Championships in Boston.

References

External links
 
 

1966 births
Living people
American male tennis players
Tennis people from California
People from Laguna Beach, California
Lander University alumni
College men's tennis players in the United States